Valloriate is a comune (municipality) in the Province of Cuneo in the Italian region Piedmont, located about  southwest of Turin and about  southwest of Cuneo.

Valloriate borders the following municipalities: Demonte, Gaiola, Moiola, Monterosso Grana, and Rittana.

References

Cities and towns in Piedmont